Clark Stacey is the co-founder and chief executive officer of WildWorks (earlier known as Smart Bomb Interactive), which in 2010 launched the National Geographic Animal Jam, a massively multiplayer online virtual world, in partnership with the National Geographic Society. The game has around 75 million registered players, and is one of the fastest-growing online children's properties worldwide, targeted at the 9–11 years age group.

Early life and career
Stacey was born and brought up in Ogden, Utah. After graduating in English and philosophy from the University of Utah, Stacey became an academician. In 1992, in consequence of his long-standing interest in the field, Stacey teamed up with Kris Johnson again and co-founded Smart Bomb Interactive, which specialized as a game development studio and earned revenues through a licensing model. During these years, video games exemplifying explosions and destruction became the leitmotifs of Stacey's video game productions. Stacey and Johnson subsequently rechristened the company as WildWorks. Based out of Salt Lake City and employing around 130 video game developers as of 2016, Stacey and Johnson went on to develop highly followed games like Animal Jam Classic, Snoopy Flying Ace, Tunnel Town, Fer.al, and others.

See also
 Snoopy Flying Ace
 ''Animal Jam Classic

References

1980 births
Living people
American chief executives
People from Salt Lake City
University of Utah alumni
Video game developers